Lluís Recasens Vives (born 19 February 2002) is a Spanish professional footballer who plays as a centre-back for RCD Espanyol B.

Club career
Born in Tarragona, Catalonia, Recasens played for local sides Gimnàstic de Tarragona and CF Reus Deportiu before joining RCD Espanyol in 2017. He made his senior debut with the latter's reserves on 18 October 2020, starting in a 2–1 Segunda División B home win against AE Prat.

Recasens subsequently became a regular starter for the B-side, partnering Ricard Pujol, and ended the campaign with 22 appearances. He made his first team – and La Liga – debut on 12 September 2021, coming on as a half-time substitute for Fernando Calero in a 1–2 home loss to Atlético Madrid.

References

External links
 
 
 

2002 births
Living people
Sportspeople from Tarragona
Spanish footballers
Footballers from Catalonia
Association football defenders
La Liga players
Segunda División B players
Segunda Federación players
RCD Espanyol B footballers
RCD Espanyol footballers
Spain youth international footballers